Miss Arrow is a fictional character appearing in American comic books published by Marvel Comics.

Publication history 
She was created by Peter David, Mike Wieringo, and Todd Nauck. She first appeared in Friendly Neighborhood Spider-Man #4 (Jan 2006).

Fictional character biography

The Other

During the events of The Other, Spider-Man died fighting his enemy Morlun. However, his body was later discovered as a sack of skin; Spider-Man had shed his skin and had retired to a 'cocoon' under the Brooklyn Bridge, which he later emerged from, completely healed of his prior wounds. Thus, Spider-Man had 'conquered' death.

Meanwhile, in Stark Tower, pirate spiders started to eat Peter's old dead body. When Spider-Man returned, the top of Stark Tower was covered in webbing. Inside the tower, Spider-Man discovered that pirate spiders had consumed Peter's discarded skin. Sated on his flesh, the spiders formed into a body of their own, female in opposition to Spider-man's male.

Declaring itself to be Spider-Man's "Other", the creature explained to Peter that it exists because Peter was supposed to die, but did not. To maintain "balance" the creature had arrived to become his opposite, as well as his equal, and would evolve as he evolved, or die as he would die. It then escaped down a drain. A cocoon was later seen in a church, where the creature presumably hibernated.

Miss Arrow
After Peter sent Flash Thompson into the infirmary due to a dodge ball to the face, Ero, taking on the form of the African American Miss Arrow, treated to Flash's injury while explaining that she was the new Midtown High School nurse. To explain her name she claimed that her parents were "inveterate hippies". When the school came under attack by the three Mysterios, Arrow quickly showed that she was not all she appeared to be. Quentin Beck saw through her guise and told her that their "superiors" wanted to keep Peter at the school, while Francis Klum saw firsthand what Arrow was capable of doing.

Arrow later convinced Spider-Man to stay at the school. However, when Peter became a fugitive for going against Iron Man, he had to use an image distorter to disguise himself as "Ben Reilly" to continue his career at the school. Later, Arrow began to show her sinister nature little by little, most notably when Flash began dating Betty Brant. While Flash and Betty were on a date Betty had to use the restroom. While there, thousands of spiders ran out from the toilet, frightening Betty. When Flash and the restaurant manager came to the scene after Betty had left the bathroom, only some cocaine and a straw was found, making the manager think Betty had used the cocaine. Betty and Flash left while Miss Arrow appeared out of the shadows.

Ero revealed
Arrow was revealed as the being composed of pirate spiders first seen in "The Other". She had disguised herself as a human and decides to set into motion her plan to have Flash become her "host". Meanwhile, Betty and Peter begin to suspect that Arrow is hiding something especially since Peter realizes that she doesn't set off his spidey-sense when she is near to discovering his secret identity. After doing some research they discover that "Arrow" sounds similar to "Ero" a genus of pirate spider. Arrow, in the meantime, has tracked Flash down at a bowling alley where he has gone with his friend, professional bowler Kelly Kulick. Not wanting to waste anymore time, Arrow proceeded to reveal her true nature to the surrounding bystanders and caused mayhem in her wake. While Spider-Man arrived in time to stop the carnage and save Kulick, Arrow made off with Flash through the sewers.

Ero takes Flash to the church where she emerged from her cocoon and, after webbing him to the ceiling, removes an eggsac from her stomach with her plan being to impregnate him. Spider-Man arrives in time once again to stop her. As they battle, Ero reveals that Spider-Man's stingers only appear when he faces "... someone like me, someone whose being is rooted in primal forces of chaos and darkness." Ero then manages to stab Spider-Man in the shoulder, drugging him and slowing him down. Having the upper hand, Ero decides to impregnate Spider-Man instead, her logic being that while the offspring will be considerably less than Flash's, it will in the end ensure her enemy's demise. Just as Ero is about to implant her eggsac into Spider-Man, Betty Brant arrives and blasts the egg sac with silver bullets, fired from a shotgun. Enraged at the loss of her eggs, and vowing revenge against Betty, she tries to escape. Spider-Man follows, and lures her into an aviary, where she is devoured alive by birds. Only a single spider remains, which Spider-Man steps on contemptuously.

Return
Kaine Parker took the offer to help his new ally Aracely, turning him into Tarantula. However, the Other made Kaine's mind unstable and he attacked Aracely. They soon came into contact with The Superior Spider-Man and later Morlun who kills him. Morlun performed a ritual that resurrected Kaine, but not the Other, who later returned themselves to life using the body of the MC2 Peter Parker.

Powers and abilities
Miss Arrow is composed of thousands of spiders that possess a hive mind, not unlike that of Thousand, however unlike Thousand Arrow was much more organized and had to adhere to typical spider behavior such as creating a sack to raise children. Arrow possessed wrist stingers that were poisonous to anyone who was stabbed by them. This was the same ability adopted by Peter and Kaine Parker. She is also shown to possess night vision.

In other media
In the first iteration of Spider-Man: Turn Off the Dark, the show was narrated by the Geek Chorus, Spider-Man fans who were in the process of writing the most extreme and ultimate Spider-Man story ever. One of them claims the name Miss Arrow. She has the most input in the show being the one who introduces the spider goddess Arachne and creates the villainess Swiss Miss. The role was played by Alice Lee.

References

External links
 

Comics characters introduced in 2006
Characters created by Peter David
Characters created by Mike Wieringo
Characters created by Todd Nauck
Fictional spiders
Marvel Comics characters with superhuman strength
Marvel Comics female supervillains
Spider-Man characters